Jerett Brooks (born July 27, 1997) is an American racing driver. He mainly competes in short course off-road racing such as TORC: The Off-Road Championship, Lucas Oil Off Road Racing Series, and Championship Off-Road.

He is a five-time off-road truck champion with three Pro Lite class titles in TORC (2014) and LOORRS (2016–2017) and two in LOORRS' Pro 2 division (2019–2020). Brooks has also competed in the Stadium Super Trucks and X Games.

Racing career

In his youth, Brooks often visited K1 Speed and built radio-controlled cars before switching to competitive trophy kart racing. In 2008, he debuted in Championship Off-Road Racing's Junior 1 Kart class. After three years in Junior Karts, he switched to LOORRS' Modified Karts and won two races in 2010.

Brooks moved up to the Pro Lites in 2012, where he befriended driver Doug Mittag who built a new truck for him the following year. Two years later, he won his first LOORRS Pro Lite race at Las Vegas Motor Speedway in addition to racing for the TORC Pro Lite championship, which he won. He returned to LOORRS in 2015. He won two consecutive LOORRS Pro Lite tiles in 2016 and 2017.

In 2017, Brooks won in his LOORRS Pro 2 class debut at Wild Horse Pass Motorsports Park. He claimed the series' Pro 2 championship in 2019 and 2020, the former of which made him the class's youngest champion at the age of 22. His Jerett Brooks Racing operation also won 2020 Team of the Year honors. When LOORRS folded after 2020, Brooks joined Championship Off-Road's Pro 2 class.

During the Stadium Super Trucks' inaugural season in 2013, Brooks debuted at Qualcomm Stadium before winning for the first time at Crandon International Off-Road Raceway. He continued racing in the series on a sporadic basis over the next two years, which included entering X Games Austin 2014 and 2015. Brooks returned to the series for the 2017 finale at Lake Elsinore Diamond as an injury replacement for Paul Morris; he finished second in the final race to beat Matthew Brabham for the title by one point. He also ran the 2018 season opener at Lake Elsinore in Morris' truck. After not racing in SST in 2019 and 2020, Brooks rejoined the trucks at Mid-Ohio Sports Car Course in July 2021, where he led the most laps in the first race and fought with Robby Gordon for the win in the second before spinning on the final lap. Two months later, Brooks won the first race at the Grand Prix of Long Beach after using his brakes conservatively to have enough strength for the finish, a tactic that he called "pretty smart"; he finished runner-up in the second race to take the weekend victory.

Personal life
A native of Alpine, California, Brooks was homeschooled in high school as his racing career interfered with his education.

Motorsports career results

Career summary

Stadium Super Trucks
(key) (Bold – Pole position. Italics – Fastest qualifier. * – Most laps led.)

References

External links
 

Living people
1997 births
People from Alpine, California
Racing drivers from California
Sportspeople from San Diego County, California
Off-road racing drivers
X Games athletes
Stadium Super Trucks drivers